Nazarabad-e Eftekhar (also Romanized as Naz̧arābād-e Eftekhār; also known as Naz̧arābād) is a village in Torkaman Rural District, in the Central District of Urmia County, West Azerbaijan Province, Iran. At the 2006 census, its population was 151, in 33 families.

References 

Populated places in Urmia County